There is no question that the Praguers of the late eighteenth century exhibited a special appreciation for the music of Wolfgang Amadeus Mozart, even though, as recently pointed out by Daniel E. Freeman, confirmations of this fact attributed to Mozart himself in sayings such as "" ("My Praguers understand me") have only come down to posterity second or third hand.  Perhaps the most valuable direct testimony that attests to the discernment of the musical public in Prague with regard to Mozart's music comes from Lorenzo Da Ponte, the librettist of Mozart's opera Don Giovanni, which was first performed in Prague:
It is not easy to convey an adequate conception of the enthusiasm of the Bohemians for [Mozart's] music.  The pieces which were admired least of all in other countries were regarded by those people as things divine; and, more wonderful still, the great beauties which other nations discovered in the music of that rare genius only after many, many performances, were perfectly appreciated by the Bohemians on the very first evening.

The most important legacy of Mozart's association with the city of Prague was the composition of the operas Don Giovanni and La clemenza di Tito and the first performance of the "Prague" Symphony, which may or may not have been composed by Mozart specifically to be performed in Prague during his first visit to the city early in 1787.

Background for Mozart's Visits to Prague

Daniel E. Freeman has provided the most comprehensive appraisal of the conditions that made Prague so attractive as a musical destination for Mozart in the 1780s. One of the most important reasons include a recovery in the population of the city that created a musical public much larger than had been present in the city just a few decades prior to this time.  It was only just before the time of Mozart's visits that the population of Prague finally recovered from the severe depopulation caused by the departure of the Imperial Habsburg court from Prague in 1612 on the death of Holy Roman Emperor Rudolf II and the effects of the Thirty Years' War (1618-1648), whose military conflicts both started and ended in the city.  Prague always retained a certain prestige as the capital city of the kingdom of Bohemia, even though its king (who doubled as Holy Roman Emperor and head of the house of Habsburg) lived in Vienna. Still, it took over a century after the death of Rudolf II for the city once again to build cultural institutions worthy of a major European city, usually due to the sponsorship of leading Bohemian nobles.  The recovery in civic life led to the construction of a magnificent new opera theater, opened in 1783, that was known at the time as the National Theater (of the kingdom of Bohemia) and built at the sole expense of a visionary noble, Count Franz Anton von Nostitz-Rieneck.  It was later purchased by the Estates of Bohemia and is presently known as the Estates Theatre.  Considering the importance of operatic productions in Mozart's musical output, the construction of this theater was virtually a pre-condition for the fertile connections he began to cultivate with Prague in the year 1786.  The emergence of an outstanding conductor, Johann Joseph Strobach, who built the opera orchestra of Prague into one of the greatest orchestral ensembles in central Europe, was also critical in attracting Mozart to the city, as was the prominence of the Duschek couple (Franz Xaver and Josepha, who had unprecedented international connections for musicians from Prague who chose not leave the Bohemian lands.  Josepha had a particularly strong connection with Mozart as a result of frequent visits she made to his native city of Salzburg, where she had relatives (one of her grandfathers was once mayor of Salzburg).

The immediate impetus for Mozart's visits was the result of interest for his compositions created by a highly successful performance in 1783 of his opera Die Entführung aus dem Serail, one of the first operas ever performed in the Estates Theatre.  This performance excited interest in Mozart's instrumental music and undoubtedly made the management of the Estates Theatre receptive to mounting a production of Le nozze di Figaro late in 1786, even though it was only a mixed success at its premiere in Vienna in May 1786.

The Prague premiere of Figaro

Mozart's opera The Marriage of Figaro, which premiered in Vienna, was produced in late 1786 in Prague with tremendous success. The reviewer for the Prague newspaper Oberpostamtzeitung wrote "No piece (so everyone here asserts) has ever caused such a sensation as the Italian opera Die Hochzeit des Figaro, which has already been given several times here with unlimited applause." The orchestra and some affiliated music lovers funded a personal visit by Mozart so he could hear the production.

Mozart's first visit to Prague and the premiere of the "Prague" Symphony

Mozart first came to Prague on 11 January 1787 and stayed until the second week of February. He was feted everywhere. On 19 January a concert was organized for his financial benefit at which the "Prague" Symphony was given its first performance. Mozart also improvised a solo on the piano—including variations on the popular aria "Non più andrai" from The Marriage of Figaro. Afterward, Mozart said he "counted this day as one of the happiest of his life." Daniel E. Freeman points out that the level of adulation accorded Mozart on this occasion by the musical public of Prague was unprecedented for any eighteenth-century musician being recognized simultaneously as both a composer and a performer.

The great success of this visit generated a commission from the impresario Pasquale Bondini for another opera, which like The Marriage of Figaro was to have a libretto by Mozart's great collaborator Lorenzo Da Ponte.

Mozart's second visit to Prague and the premiere of Don Giovanni

Mozart came to Prague for the second time to help supervise the first performance of his opera Don Giovanni. He arrived on 4 October 1787 and stayed until 12 or 13 November.  The premiere of the opera was supposed to have taken place on 15 October, but could not be arranged until 29 October 1787. The work was rapturously received; the Prager Oberpostamtzeitung reported, "Connoisseurs and musicians say that Prague has never heard the like," and "the opera ... is extremely difficult to perform."

Mozart's third and fourth visits to Prague

En route to Berlin in the company of Prince Karl Lichnowsky, Mozart passed through Prague on 10 April 1789 and returned on his way back to Vienna on 31 May 1789 and stayed perhaps a day or two longer. For further details, see Mozart's Berlin journey.

Mozart's fifth visit and the premiere of La clemenza di Tito

Mozart wrote La clemenza di Tito for the festivities accompanying Leopold II's Prague coronation as king of Bohemia in September 1791. Mozart obtained this commission after Antonio Salieri had allegedly rejected it. Mozart arrived on 28 August 1791 and left in the third week of September.  The opera received its first performance on 6 September 1791.  Unlike the first two visits, Mozart was not the center of attention on his last visit.  Rather, his activities were much overshadowed by the ceremonies of the Imperial court.

Commemorations of Mozart's death in Prague

The grief exhibited for Mozart in Prague after his death on 5 December 1791 far exceeded that witnessed in any other European city.  Daniel E. Freeman has pointed out that whereas Mozart (one of history's greatest musicians) was laid to rest in Vienna without any special performance of music and a pathetic showing of mourners, the first memorial service given in his honor in Prague (14 December 1791) was attended by thousands and featured a lavish Requiem mass performed by over a hundred musicians who accepted no pay for their efforts.  Many more commemorations were organized in subsequent years and citizens of Prague took it upon themselves to provide sustenance to Mozart's widow and orphaned children.  His wife Constanze began her career of organizing musical concerts in memory of her husband in Prague, a lucrative undertaking that assisted her family's finances enormously until her second marriage to Georg Nikolaus von Nissen.

Why didn't Mozart stay?

After Don Giovanni, Mozart may have had a tentative offer to stay and write another opera for Prague, but he chose to return to Vienna. Maynard Solomon suggested that the reasons were first that Prague lacked the musical talent available in Vienna. In addition, a career like Mozart's depended on the support of the aristocracy, and Prague was only a provincial capital. There was no patron or musical institution in Prague in the late eighteenth century capable of offering satisfactory employment to a composer of Mozart's talents.  Furthermore, Daniel E. Freeman has pointed out how precarious opera production was in the city throughout the eighteenth century.  Indeed, productions of Italian opera in Prague ceased again already in 1789, not to re-appear again until 1791, due to the departure of the impresario Domenico Guardasoni and the death of the impresario Pasquale Bondini.

Another possible reason why Mozart didn't stay is given by Volkmar Braunbehrens, citing Schenk: the death in Vienna in November 1787 of Gluck, whose post in the Imperial musical establishment Mozart sought (and ultimately got, though at a much lower salary); Mozart needed to return home to lobby for the position. Daniel E. Freeman has pointed out that the imperial appointment meant that Mozart would never live in any city other than Vienna.  The prestige of such a position combined with the possibility of further employment and honors from the imperial court would have rendered any opportunities available in Prague unattractive in comparison.

Why did Prague appreciate Mozart?

Daniel E. Freeman has produced the most detailed appraisal of the reasons for the success of Mozart's music in late eighteenth-century Prague The most important consideration is simply that the citizenry of Prague was likely the most musically literate of any in Europe due to a unique system of music education that grew up in the Bohemian lands after the defeat of Protestant nobles in revolt against the Habsburg regime in the year 1620.  The country was forcibly re-Catholicized by the Habsburg emperors, and a part of efforts to impose the Catholic religion on the populace was the fostering of Catholic church music.  Music education for both boys and girls was offered as a normal part of elementary education throughout the kingdom of Bohemia, with the result that an unusually large proportion of the population was trained to sing or play instruments.  The training was never intended to foster professional careers, rather to facilitate participation in religious services, however it did lead to many professional careers and the famous emigration of Bohemian musicians to many parts of Europe due to a surplus of musical talent within the country.  Contemporary observers considered the Bohemians to be as naturally musically talented as the Italians, however better trained in notation and other technical aspects of music making.  The musical public of Prague, well versed in practical music making, clearly had a greater appreciation for the possibilities that Mozart explored in a style that many music lovers in other European cities (including Vienna) found too complicated and too extravagant (to use the famous phrase of the emperor Joseph II, with "too many notes").  The success of the highly sophisticated and supremely difficult music for the "Prague" Symphony and the opera Don Giovanni attests to this appreciation better than anything else.

Mozart also had an unusual ability to compose imaginatively for wind instruments.  Bohemian wind players were famed all over Europe for their skills, thus his mastery of wind composition was much appreciated in Prague.  The Prague press specifically attributed the success of the operas Die Entführung aus dem Serail and Le nozze di Figaro partially to their lavish and imaginative treatment of wind instruments.  The extravagant writing for winds in the "Prague" Symphony is also notable and may have been introduced deliberately to please the musical public of Prague.  The treatment of winds in the "Prague" Symphony represents a landmark in symphonic writing and was copied not only in Mozart's last symphonies, but also the symphonies of Beethoven and Schubert.

Commemorating Mozart in Prague today

Many tourists follow his tracks in Prague and visit the Mozart Museum of the reconstructed Villa Bertramka, where the composer stayed with his friends the Duscheks on visits to Prague.  It is little known that Mozart's visits to the Bertramka are actually very scantily documented.  No contemporary observer ever reported seeing him there, and Mozart himself never reported staying there in any surviving correspondence from Prague.  The best evidence that he stayed there (and only during his second visit to Prague) comes from his son Karl Thomas Mozart in a reminiscence of 1856.  Carl Thomas was not present for the incident reported, rather only heard about it from friends of Mozart he met in Prague as a boy in the 1790s.

Notes

References
 Braunbehrens, Volkmar (1990) Mozart in Vienna. New York: Grove Weidenfeld.
 Daniel E. Freeman (2021) Mozart in Prague. Minneapolis: Calumet Editions. 
 Eisen, Cliff and Stanley Sadie. Article in the New Grove, online edition. (Accessed 9 May 2006)] 
 Solomon, Maynard (1995) Mozart: A life, Harper Perennial. 

Prague
Music in Prague